Sisowath Watchayavong (13 September 189130 January 1972) was a Cambodian politician who served as the Prime Minister of Cambodia from 1947 to 1948. He was a grandson of King Sisowath.

References

 

 

1891 births
1972 deaths
20th-century Cambodian politicians 
Cambodian princes 
Democratic Party (Cambodia) politicians 
Prime Ministers of Cambodia
House of Sisowath
Sciences Po alumni